is a Japanese manga series written and illustrated by Shinobu Ohtaka. It was serialized in Kodansha's Weekly Shōnen Magazine from May 2018 to January 2021 and later transferred to Bessatsu Shōnen Magazine in February 2021. Kodansha USA licensed the manga for English release in North America. An anime television series adaptation by A.C.G.T aired from January to September 2022.

Plot
The story revolves around a 15-year-old boy named Musashi and takes place during Japan's Sengoku period. At the time, Japan is ruled by Oni and Bushi are considered taboo. Musashi is blending in as a miner along with others who are brainwashed into thinking the demons are their saviors and fed lies about the samurai being evil. However, Musashi knows the truth. He wants to confront the demons with his certain special power.

Characters

Main characters

Musashi is a cheerful and caring person. He firmly proposed to be a Bushi along with his friend Kojiro Kanemaki, and has great determination. The parents of Musashi were farmers and were amiable to the Kanemaki family. One day, Musashi approaches Kojiro during his training and came everyday since then to play and practice. He promises Kojiro he will become a samurai once they grow up. After the death of his parents however, he sought shelter from house to house and finally decides to stay at his relatives but they reject him and say that he must insult Jisai Kanemaki. He curses out Jisai without true intention, and later goes to the Kanemaki residence to apologize. Jisai forgives him and says he is grateful for him to befriend Kojiro, and takes him in, training him in swordsmanship.

Kojiro is a kind, caring, and a self-sufficient person. Ever since the death of his father, his trait of independency grew. He is competitive with Musashi and is great at strategizing fights. He and his father lived in the outskirts of Tatsumaya town and were treated badly by the villagers who had been influenced to worship the Oni. One day, Kojiro is practicing swordsmanship and encounters Musashi, who was impressed by his swordsmanship skills. Musashi became his only friend since then. He learns his swordsmanship skills from his father, Jisai.

Tsugumi is a cheerful and forgiving person. At times, she can be manipulating, by using her body. She was taken in by Hideo Kosameda with her sister after the death of her parents. She is also deceiving in such a manner that she flashes her opponents to defeat them. Initially, Tsugumi meets Musashi and Kojiro in the desert. She attempted to steal from them, and somewhat succeeded.

Other characters

Media

Manga
Orient, written and illustrated by Shinobu Ohtaka, was serialized in Kodansha's Weekly Shōnen Magazine from May 30, 2018, to January 6, 2021. The manga was then transferred to Kodansha's Bessatsu Shōnen Magazine on February 9, 2021. Kodansha has compiled its chapters into individual tankōbon volumes. The first volume was published on August 17, 2018. As of March 9, 2023, eighteen volumes have been released.

In March 2020, Kodansha USA announced the acquisition of the manga for English language digital release, with the first volume being released on April 7, 2020. Kodansha USA also announced the print release of the manga starting on January 26, 2021. The manga has also been licensed in Germany by Kazé and in France by Pika.

Volume list

Anime
On January 4, 2021, it was announced that the series will receive an anime television series adaptation. The series is animated by A.C.G.T and directed by Tetsuya Yanagisawa, with Mariko Kunisawa handling the scripts, Takahiro Kishida designing the characters, and Hideyuki Fukasawa composing the series' music. It aired from January 6 to March 24, 2022, on TV Tokyo and AT-X. Da-ice performed the series' opening theme song "Break Out", while Wataru Hatano performed the series' ending theme song "Naniiro." Crunchyroll licensed the series outside of Asia. Medialink licensed the series in Southeast Asia and South Asia; they released it on Ani-One Ultra YouTube channel for membership subscribers, iQIYI and Animax Asia.  On January 13, 2022, Crunchyroll announced that the series will receive an English dub, which premiered on February 23.

At the end of the twelfth episode, a second cour was announced, which aired from July 12 to September 27, 2022. The opening theme song is "Break it down" by Sōta Hanamura from Da-ice and Lil' Fang from Faky, while the ending theme song is "Irochigai no Itotaba" by Gakuto Kajiwara.

Episode list

Reception
Rebecca Silverman of Anime News Network, gave the first volume 3½ out of five stars. Silverman praised the series for its iconography, adding that the demons are drawn with the same symbols and styling seen in Buddhist imagery, like bodhisattva with horns, fangs, and talons. She added that Ohtaka's art improved with the series and appreciated her departure from the "boob jokes" presented in her earlier works, making the series feel "less juvenile while still being good for middle grade readers". Silverman concluded: "in the shounen action line, this is looking like a safe bet". Faye Hopper of the same website, gave the first volume 2½ out of five stars. Hopper praised the series' art, but criticized it for its execution and pacing, adding: "New characters appear out of nowhere and are not given proper introductions, character arcs are not meaningfully advanced, and any potential tension is lost in how the characters don't face meaningful consequences for their actions. It is a mess." Hopper concluded: "a final impression is just as important as an introductory one. And sadly, at the end of the day, Orient just does not keep up its momentum".

Notes

References

External links
  
  
 
 

2022 anime television series debuts
Adventure anime and manga
Anime series based on manga
Avex Group
Crunchyroll anime
Historical fantasy anime and manga
Kodansha manga
Medialink
Sengoku period in fiction
Shōnen manga
TV Tokyo original programming